Rikhado Muziwendlovu Makhado (20 July 1987  23 February 2022), known professionally as Riky Rick, was a South African rapper, singer, songwriter, record producer and entrepreneur. He was also the founder and owner of record label Cotton Club Records and a member of Boyz N Bucks and he's well known for his hit song Boss Zonke from his album Family Values. 

He came into the limelight between 2009 and 2010, when he dropped mixtapes such as The Comeback Kid and Last Summer with Da L.E.S.

Life and career

19872014: Early life and early career 

Rikhado Chifaro Makhado was born on 20 July 1987. He was raised in KwaMashu township near Durban, Natal. His childhood friends described him as a creative individual who was entrepreneurial, kind and artistically gifted, even at a young age.

Makhado's music career actually began at a recording studio session with Bongani Fassie. It was by Fassie's side that Makhado was inspired to make his own music. That is when he released his first single "Barbershop" featuring Da L.E.S.

20152022: Family Values, Scooby Snacks EP 

His single "Nafukwa" which was released in 2014, won an MTV Africa Music Award for Video of the Year.

On 3 April 2015, his debut studio album Family Values was released and received positive reviews from music critics. It featured guest appearances from Cassper Nyovest, Okmalumkoolkat, Zano and Black Motion. The album was certified platinum by the Recording Industry of South Africa (RiSA) with sales of over 50 000 units. Its success saw him nominated for eight South African Hip-Hop Awards (SAHHAs) that year, more than any other artist. Family Values remains his only studio album to date. It was released and made available for purchase on iTunes by Makhado Makhado Agency on 3 April 2015.

On 24 April 2014, his single "Sondela", featuring Zano was released, which was dedicated to his beloved wife Bianca. On 28 October 2014,the smash hit "Boss Zonke" was released, which peaked at number 3 on the SA Hip Hop Top Ten List.

One of the most popular tracks on the tracklist "Amantombazane" led to the "Amantombazane (Remix)" which featured fellow South African recording artists OkMalumkoolKat, Maggz, Kwesta, Ginger Bread Man, Kid X, Nadia Nakai and DJ Dimplez. The track was nominated for Remix of the Year at the 2015 South African Music Awards (SAMAs).

In June 2016, his single "Sidlukotini" was released. "Sidlukotini" directly translates to "We are eating cotton" in Zulu. This song spoke to Makhado's love for fashion. For Sidlukotini, he won Best Hit Single at the 2016 Metro FM Music Awards, an award ceremony that infamously saw him take to the stage and criticise the awards for being rigged before encouraging upcoming musicians to forget the radio and make their songs "pop on the internet".

He left independent record label Mabala Noise shortly after the awards. He then released the Scooby Snacks EP that features only one artist, Frank Casino. It includes the tracks "Oh Lord", "Bandz Over Fans" and "Family" (featuring Frank Casino). He followed up his growing body of work when he released "Buy It Out" on 15 September 2017. Just a year later, he released a new EP, Stay Shining, through a licensing deal between his new label Cotton Club Records and Sony Music Entertainment Africa.

In November 2018, he announced his first concert called "Cotton Fest", which he personally headlined on 2 February 2019. In an interview in 2019, Riky described the festival as being "... for us, by us, for the people, for everybody. It's not about me. It's not a one-man show."

Personal life 

In early 2010, Makhado met his wife Bianca Naidoo in Sandton. She had a daughter, Jordan from a previous relationship. After close to three years of dating, the couple got married in 2013. About a year later, they welcomed their first child together, a son whom they named Maik Daniel.
In 2020, in an interview with rapper Yanga Chief on his Lab Live YouTube series, Makhado opened up about his suicidal past. After battling alcohol and drug addiction in his youth, he practiced sobriety after going through a difficult time.

Death 
Makhado died on 23 February 2022  in Johannesburg, aged 34. The cause of death was reported as suicide by hanging after a lengthy battle with depression.

Discography

Studio albums

EPs

Mixtapes 

 Comeback Kid (2011)

Awards and nominations

References 

1987 births
2022 deaths
2022 suicides
South African male actors
South African rappers
South African hip hop musicians
Zulu people
People from KwaZulu-Natal
Alumni of Hilton College (South Africa)
Suicides in South Africa